Mont Mort is a mountain of the Pennine Alps, located on the border between Switzerland and Italy. It is located on the main chain of the Alps, just south-east of the Great St Bernard Pass.

On the west side of the mountain is a secondary summit named Petit Mont Mort (2,809 m). The Great St Bernard Tunnel runs below it.

References

External links
 Mont Mort on Hikr

Mountains of the Alps
Mountains of Valais
Mountains of Aosta Valley
Italy–Switzerland border
International mountains of Europe
Mountains of Switzerland
Two-thousanders of Switzerland